Marga Floer is a German paralympic swimmer, and pentathlete.

She competed at the 1968 Summer Paralympics, winning a gold medal in Women's 50 metre freestyle. She competed in Women's Club Throw, Novices 60 metre Wheelchair Dash C, Women's Precision Javelin, and Women's Shot Put 

She competed at the 1972 Summer Paralympics, winning a gold medal in Women's Pentathlon 4.

References 

Paralympic gold medalists for West Germany
Paralympic swimmers of Germany